Zipperlandville is an unincorporated community in Falls County, Texas, United States.Founded by the reverend Paul Zipper, In 2000, the population was 22.

References

Unincorporated communities in Falls County, Texas
Unincorporated communities in Texas